According to the sixth population census in 2010 the overall literacy rate in the People's Republic of China was 95.92 per cent. In the different regions the illiteracy rate varies considerably, though. The following is a list of the first-level administrative divisions covered in the population census, including all provinces, autonomous regions and municipalities, in order of their officially reported illiteracy rate for people aged 15 and above in 2010. The figures are from the 2010 census published by the Bureau of Statistics of the PRC.

Figures from a different source, the CIA World Factbook, are given for the special administrative regions Hong Kong (2002) and Macau (2001); these are not directly comparable as the methodologies used may differ.

Mainland China

Hong Kong and Macau

External links
National Bureau of Statistics

Illiteracy
Illiteracy rate
Illiteracy rate
Literacy
China, illiteracy rate